Sincere is the debut studio album by English musician MJ Cole. It was released in December 2000 under the Talkin' Loud label. The album reached number 14 on the UK Albums Chart in August 2001. It was included in the book 1001 Albums You Must Hear Before You Die.

Track listing

Certifications

References

External links

Sincere at Metacritic.com

2000 debut albums
MJ Cole albums
Island Records albums